The Battle of Erzurum may refer to:

 Battle of Erzurum (1821), Persians defeat Turks during the Ottoman–Persian War
 Battle of Erzurum (1877), Turks defend the city during the Russo-Turkish War
 Battle of Erzurum (1916), Russians defeat Turks during World War I